Lawrenson is an English patronymic surname. Notable people with the surname include:

Johnny Lawrenson (1921–2010), English rugby league player
Leslie Lawrenson (1902–1978), Irish Anglican bishop
Mark Lawrenson (born 1957), English footballer, manager and television presenter
Mary Lawrenson (1850–1943), English co-operator
Peter Lawrenson (1933–2017), British electrical engineer
Robert Lawrenson (born 1971), English actor

English-language surnames
Patronymic surnames